In Greek mythology, Achilles or Achilleus was a hero of the Trojan War, the greatest of all the Greek warriors, and the central character of Homer's Iliad. He was the son of the Nereid Thetis and Peleus, king of Phthia.

Achilles' most notable feat during the Trojan War was the slaying of the Trojan prince Hector outside the gates of Troy. Although the death of Achilles is not presented in the Iliad, other sources concur that he was killed near the end of the Trojan War by Paris, who shot him with an arrow. Later legends (beginning with Statius' unfinished epic Achilleid, written in the 1st century AD) state that Achilles was invulnerable in all of his body except for one heel, because when his mother Thetis dipped him in the river Styx as an infant, she held him by one of his heels. Alluding to these legends, the term "Achilles' heel" has come to mean a point of weakness, especially in someone or something with an otherwise strong constitution. The Achilles tendon is also named after him due to these legends.

Etymology 

Linear B tablets attest to the personal name Achilleus in the forms a-ki-re-u and a-ki-re-we, the latter being the dative of the former. The name grew more popular, becoming common soon after the seventh century BC and was also turned into the female form Ἀχιλλεία (Achilleía), attested in Attica in the fourth century BC (IG II² 1617) and, in the form Achillia, on a stele in Halicarnassus as the name of a female gladiator fighting an "Amazon".

Achilles' name can be analyzed as a combination of  "distress, pain, sorrow, grief" and  "people, soldiers, nation", resulting in a proto-form *Akhí-lāu̯os "he who has the people distressed" or "he whose people have distress". The grief or distress of the people is a theme raised numerous times in the Iliad (and frequently by Achilles himself). Furthermore, laós has been construed by Gregory Nagy, following Leonard Palmer, to mean "a corps of soldiers", a muster. With this derivation, the name obtains a double meaning in the poem: when the hero is functioning rightly, his men bring distress to the enemy, but when wrongly, his men get the grief of war. The poem is in part about the misdirection of anger on the part of leadership.

Some researchers deem the name a loan word, possibly from a Pre-Greek language. Achilles' descent from the Nereid Thetis and a similarity of his name with those of river deities such as Acheron and Achelous have led to speculations about his being an old water divinity . Robert S. P. Beekes has suggested a Pre-Greek origin of the name, based among other things on the coexistence of -λλ- and -λ- in epic language, which may account for a palatalized phoneme /ly/ in the original language.

Description 
In the account of Dares the Phrygian, Achilles was described having ". . .a large chest, a fine mouth, and powerfully formed arms and legs. His head was covered with long wavy chestnut-colored hair. Though mild in manner, he was very fierce in battle. His face showed the joy of a man richly endowed."

Birth and early years 

Achilles was the son of Thetis, a Nereid and daughter of The Old Man of the Sea, and Peleus, the king of the Myrmidons. Zeus and Poseidon had been rivals for Thetis's hand in marriage until Prometheus, the fore-thinker, warned Zeus of a prophecy (originally uttered by Themis, goddess of divine law) that Thetis would bear a son greater than his father. For this reason, the two gods withdrew their pursuit, and had her wed Peleus.

There is a tale which offers an alternative version of these events: In the Argonautica (4.760) Zeus' sister and wife Hera alludes to Thetis' chaste resistance to the advances of Zeus, pointing out that Thetis was so loyal to Hera's marriage bond that she coolly rejected the father of gods. Thetis, although a daughter of the sea-god Nereus, was also brought up by Hera, further explaining her resistance to the advances of Zeus. Zeus was furious and decreed that she would never marry an immortal.

According to the Achilleid, written by Statius in the 1st century AD, and to non-surviving previous sources, when Achilles was born Thetis tried to make him immortal by dipping him in the river Styx; however, he was left vulnerable at the part of the body by which she held him: his left heel . It is not clear if this version of events was known earlier. In another version of this story, Thetis anointed the boy in ambrosia and put him on top of a fire in order to burn away the mortal parts of his body. She was interrupted by Peleus and abandoned both father and son in a rage.

None of the sources before Statius make any reference to this general invulnerability. To the contrary, in the Iliad, Homer mentions Achilles being wounded: in Book 21 the Paeonian hero Asteropaeus, son of Pelagon, challenged Achilles by the river Scamander. He was ambidextrous, and cast a spear from each hand; one grazed Achilles' elbow, "drawing a spurt of blood".

In the few fragmentary poems of the Epic Cycle which describe the hero's death (i.e. the Cypria, the Little Iliad by Lesches of Pyrrha, the Aithiopis and Iliou persis by Arctinus of Miletus), there is no trace of any reference to his general invulnerability or his famous weakness at the heel. In the later vase paintings presenting the death of Achilles, the arrow (or in many cases, arrows) hit his torso.

Peleus entrusted Achilles to Chiron the Centaur, who lived on Mount Pelion, to be reared. Thetis foretold that her son's fate was either to gain glory and die young, or to live a long but uneventful life in obscurity. Achilles chose the former, and decided to take part in the Trojan War. According to Homer, Achilles grew up in Phthia with his companion Patroclus.

According to Photius, the sixth book of the New History by Ptolemy Hephaestion reported that Thetis burned in a secret place the children she had by Peleus. When she had Achilles, Peleus noticed, tore him from the flames with only a burnt foot, and confided him to the centaur Chiron. Later Chiron exhumed the body of the Damysus, who was the fastest of all the giants, removed the ankle, and incorporated it into Achilles' burnt foot.

Other names 
Among the appellations under which Achilles is generally known are the following:
 Pyrisous, "saved from the fire", his first name, which seems to favour the tradition in which his mortal parts were burned by his mother Thetis
 Aeacides, from his grandfather Aeacus
 Aemonius, from Aemonia, a country which afterwards acquired the name of Thessaly
 Aspetos, "inimitable" or "vast", his name at Epirus
 Larissaeus, from Larissa (also called Cremaste), a town of Achaia Phthiotis in Thessaly
 Ligyron, his original name
 Nereius, from his mother Thetis, one of the Nereids
 Pelides, from his father, Peleus
 Phthius, from his birthplace, Phthia
 Podarkes, "swift-footed" (literally, "defending with the foot," from the verb ἀρκέω, "to defend, ward off"); Ptolemy Hephaestion, alternatively, says that it was due to the wings of Arke being attached to his feet.

Hidden on Skyros 

Some post-Homeric sources claim that in order to keep Achilles safe from the war, Thetis (or, in some versions, Peleus) hid the young man dressed as a princess or at least a girl at the court of Lycomedes, king of Skyros. 

There, Achilles, properly disguised, lived among Lycomedes' daughters, perhaps under the name "Pyrrha" (the red-haired girl), Cercysera or Aissa ("swift"). With Lycomedes' daughter Deidamia, whom in the account of Statius he raped, Achilles there fathered two sons, Neoptolemus (also called Pyrrhus, after his father's possible alias) and Oneiros. According to this story, Odysseus learned from the prophet Calchas that the Achaeans would be unable to capture Troy without Achilles' aid. Odysseus went to Skyros in the guise of a peddler selling women's clothes and jewellery and placed a shield and spear among his goods. When Achilles instantly took up the spear, Odysseus saw through his disguise and convinced him to join the Greek campaign. In another version of the story, Odysseus arranged for a trumpet alarm to be sounded while he was with Lycomedes' women. While the women fled in panic, Achilles prepared to defend the court, thus giving his identity away.

In the Trojan War 

According to the Iliad, Achilles arrived at Troy with 50 ships, each carrying 50 Myrmidons. He appointed five leaders (each leader commanding 500 Myrmidons): Menesthius, Eudorus, Peisander, Phoenix and Alcimedon.

Telephus 
When the Greeks left for the Trojan War, they accidentally stopped in Mysia, ruled by King Telephus. In the resulting battle, Achilles gave Telephus a wound that would not heal; Telephus consulted an oracle, who stated that "he that wounded shall heal". Guided by the oracle, he arrived at Argos, where Achilles healed him in order that he might become their guide for the voyage to Troy.

According to other reports in Euripides' lost play about Telephus, he went to Aulis pretending to be a beggar and asked Achilles to heal his wound. Achilles refused, claiming to have no medical knowledge. Alternatively, Telephus held Orestes for ransom, the ransom being Achilles' aid in healing the wound. Odysseus reasoned that the spear had inflicted the wound; therefore, the spear must be able to heal it. Pieces of the spear were scraped off onto the wound and Telephus was healed.

Troilus 

According to the Cypria (the part of the Epic Cycle that tells the events of the Trojan War before Achilles' wrath), when the Achaeans desired to return home, they were restrained by Achilles, who afterwards attacked the cattle of Aeneas, sacked neighbouring cities (like Pedasus and Lyrnessus, where the Greeks capture the queen Briseis) and killed Tenes, a son of Apollo, as well as Priam's son Troilus in the sanctuary of Apollo Thymbraios; however, the romance between Troilus and Chryseis described in Geoffrey Chaucer's Troilus and Criseyde and in William Shakespeare's Troilus and Cressida is a medieval invention.

In Dares Phrygius' Account of the Destruction of Troy, the Latin summary through which the story of Achilles was transmitted to medieval Europe, as well as in older accounts, Troilus was a young Trojan prince, the youngest of King Priam's and Hecuba's five legitimate sons (or according other sources, another son of Apollo). Despite his youth, he was one of the main Trojan war leaders, a "horse fighter" or "chariot fighter" according to Homer. Prophecies linked Troilus' fate to that of Troy and so he was ambushed in an attempt to capture him. Yet Achilles, struck by the beauty of both Troilus and his sister Polyxena, and overcome with lust, directed his sexual attentions on the youth – who, refusing to yield, instead found himself decapitated upon an altar-omphalos of Apollo Thymbraios. Later versions of the story suggested Troilus was accidentally killed by Achilles in an over-ardent lovers' embrace. In this version of the myth, Achilles' death therefore came in retribution for this sacrilege. Ancient writers treated Troilus as the epitome of a dead child mourned by his parents. Had Troilus lived to adulthood, the First Vatican Mythographer claimed, Troy would have been invincible; however, the motif is older and found already in Plautus' Bacchides.

In the Iliad 

Homer's Iliad is the most famous narrative of Achilles' deeds in the Trojan War. Achilles' wrath (μῆνις Ἀχιλλέως, mênis Achilléōs) is the central theme of the poem. The first two lines of the Iliad read:

The Homeric epic only covers a few weeks of the decade-long war, and does not narrate Achilles' death. It begins with Achilles' withdrawal from battle after being dishonoured by Agamemnon, the commander of the Achaean forces. Agamemnon has taken a woman named Chryseis as his slave. Her father Chryses, a priest of Apollo, begs Agamemnon to return her to him. Agamemnon refuses, and Apollo sends a plague amongst the Greeks. The prophet Calchas correctly determines the source of the troubles but will not speak unless Achilles vows to protect him. Achilles does so, and Calchas declares that Chryseis must be returned to her father. Agamemnon consents, but then commands that Achilles' battle prize Briseis, the daughter of Briseus, be brought to him to replace Chryseis. Angry at the dishonour of having his plunder and glory taken away (and, as he says later, because he loves Briseis), with the urging of his mother Thetis, Achilles refuses to fight or lead his troops alongside the other Greek forces. At the same time, burning with rage over Agamemnon's theft, Achilles prays to Thetis to convince Zeus to help the Trojans gain ground in the war, so that he may regain his honour.

As the battle turns against the Greeks, thanks to the influence of Zeus, Nestor declares that the Trojans are winning because Agamemnon has angered Achilles, and urges the king to appease the warrior. Agamemnon agrees and sends Odysseus and two other chieftains, Ajax and Phoenix. They promise that, if Achilles returns to battle, Agamemnon will return the captive Briseis and other gifts. Achilles rejects all Agamemnon offers him and simply urges the Greeks to sail home as he was planning to do.

The Trojans, led by Hector, subsequently push the Greek army back toward the beaches and assault the Greek ships. With the Greek forces on the verge of absolute destruction, Patroclus leads the Myrmidons into battle, wearing Achilles' armour, though Achilles remains at his camp. Patroclus succeeds in pushing the Trojans back from the beaches, but is killed by Hector before he can lead a proper assault on the city of Troy.

After receiving the news of the death of Patroclus from Antilochus, the son of Nestor, Achilles grieves over his beloved companion's death. His mother Thetis comes to comfort the distraught Achilles. She persuades Hephaestus to make new armour for him, in place of the armour that Patroclus had been wearing, which was taken by Hector. The new armour includes the Shield of Achilles, described in great detail in the poem.

Enraged over the death of Patroclus, Achilles ends his refusal to fight and takes the field, killing many men in his rage but always seeking out Hector. Achilles even engages in battle with the river god Scamander, who has become angry that Achilles is choking his waters with all the men he has killed. The god tries to drown Achilles but is stopped by Hera and Hephaestus. Zeus himself takes note of Achilles' rage and sends the gods to restrain him so that he will not go on to sack Troy itself before the time allotted for its destruction, seeming to show that the unhindered rage of Achilles can defy fate itself. Finally, Achilles finds his prey. Achilles chases Hector around the wall of Troy three times before Athena, in the form of Hector's favorite and dearest brother, Deiphobus, persuades Hector to stop running and fight Achilles face to face. After Hector realizes the trick, he knows the battle is inevitable. Wanting to go down fighting, he charges at Achilles with his only weapon, his sword, but misses. Accepting his fate, Hector begs Achilles not to spare his life, but to treat his body with respect after killing him. Achilles tells Hector it is hopeless to expect that of him, declaring that "my rage, my fury would drive me now to hack your flesh away and eat you raw – such agonies you have caused me". Achilles then kills Hector and drags his corpse by its heels behind his chariot. After having a dream where Patroclus begs Achilles to hold his funeral, Achilles hosts a series of funeral games in honour of his companion.

At the onset of his duel with Hector, Achilles is referred to as the brightest star in the sky, which comes on in the autumn, Orion's dog (Sirius); a sign of evil. During the cremation of Patroclus, he is compared to Hesperus, the evening/western star (Venus), while the burning of the funeral pyre lasts until Phosphorus, the morning/eastern star (also Venus) has set (descended).

With the assistance of the god Hermes (Argeiphontes), Hector's father Priam goes to Achilles' tent to plead with Achilles for the return of Hector's body so that he can be buried. Achilles relents and promises a truce for the duration of the funeral, lasting 9 days with a burial on the 10th (in the tradition of Niobe's offspring). The poem ends with a description of Hector's funeral, with the doom of Troy and Achilles himself still to come.

Later epic accounts: fighting Penthesilea and Memnon 

The Aethiopis (7th century BC) and a work named Posthomerica, composed by Quintus of Smyrna in the fourth century CE, relate further events from the Trojan War. When Penthesilea, queen of the Amazons and daughter of Ares, arrives in Troy, Priam hopes that she will defeat Achilles. After his temporary truce with Priam, Achilles fights and kills the warrior queen, only to grieve over her death later. At first, he was so distracted by her beauty, he did not fight as intensely as usual. Once he realized that his distraction was endangering his life, he refocused and killed her.

Following the death of Patroclus, Nestor's son Antilochus becomes Achilles' closest companion. When Memnon, son of the Dawn Goddess Eos and king of Ethiopia, slays Antilochus, Achilles once more obtains revenge on the battlefield, killing Memnon. Consequently, Eos will not let the sun rise until Zeus persuades her. The fight between Achilles and Memnon over Antilochus echoes that of Achilles and Hector over Patroclus, except that Memnon (unlike Hector) was also the son of a goddess.

Many Homeric scholars argued that episode inspired many details in the Iliads description of the death of Patroclus and Achilles' reaction to it. The episode then formed the basis of the cyclic epic Aethiopis, which was composed after the Iliad, possibly in the 7th century BC. The Aethiopis is now lost, except for scattered fragments quoted by later authors.

Achilles and Patroclus 

The exact nature of Achilles' relationship with Patroclus has been a subject of dispute in both the classical period and modern times. In the Iliad, it appears to be the model of a deep and loyal friendship. Homer does not suggest that Achilles and his close friend Patroclus had sexual relations. Although there is no direct evidence in the text of the Iliad that Achilles and Patroclus were lovers, this theory was expressed by some later authors. Commentators from classical antiquity to the present have often interpreted the relationship through the lens of their own cultures. In 5th-century BC Athens, the intense bond was often viewed in light of the Greek custom of paiderasteia, which is the relationship between an older male and a younger one, usually a teenager. In Patroclus and Achilles' case, Achilles would have been the younger as Patroclus is usually seen as his elder. In Plato's Symposium, the participants in a dialogue about love assume that Achilles and Patroclus were a couple; Phaedrus argues that Achilles was the younger and more beautiful one so he was the beloved and Patroclus was the lover. However, ancient Greek had no words to distinguish heterosexual and homosexual, and it was assumed that a man could both desire handsome young men and have sex with women. Many pairs of men throughout history have been compared to Achilles and Patroclus to imply a homosexual relationship.

Death 

The death of Achilles, even if considered solely as it occurred in the oldest sources, is a complex one, with many different versions.  Starting with the oldest account, In the Iliad Book XXII, Hector predicts with his last dying breath that Paris and Apollo will slay him at the Scaean Gates leading to Troy (with an arrow to the heel according to Statius). In Book XXIII, the sad spirit of dead Patroclus visits Achilles just as he drifts off into slumber, requesting that his bones be placed with those of Achilles in his golden vase, a gift of his mother.

In the Odyssey Book XI, Odysseus sails to the underworld and converses with the shades. One of these is Achilles, who when greeted as "blessed in life, blessed in death", responds that he would rather be a slave to the worst of masters than be king of all the dead. But Achilles then asks Odysseus of his son's exploits in the Trojan war, and when Odysseus tells of Neoptolemus' heroic actions, Achilles is filled with satisfaction.

In the Odyssey Book XXIV we read dead King Agamemnon's ghostly account of his death: Achilles' funeral pyre bleached bones had been mixed with those of Patroclus and put into his mother's golden vase. Also, the bones of Antilocus, who had become closer to Achilles than any other following Patroclus' death, were separately enclosed.  And, the customary funeral games of a hero were performed, and a massive tomb or mound was built on the Hellespont for approaching seagoers to celebrate.

Achilles was represented in the Aethiopis as living after his death in the island of Leuke at the mouth of the river Danube.  Another version of Achilles' death is that he fell deeply in love with one of the Trojan princesses, Polyxena. Achilles asks Priam for Polyxena's hand in marriage. Priam is willing because it would mean the end of the war and an alliance with the world's greatest warrior. But while Priam is overseeing the private marriage of Polyxena and Achilles, Paris, who would have to give up Helen if Achilles married his sister, hides in the bushes and shoots Achilles with a divine arrow, killing him.  According to some accounts, he had married Medea in life, so that after both their deaths they were united in the Elysian Fields of Hades – as Hera promised Thetis in Apollonius' Argonautica (3rd century BC).

Fate of Achilles' armour 

Achilles' armour was the object of a feud between Odysseus and Telamonian Ajax (Ajax the greater). They competed for it by giving speeches on why they were the bravest after Achilles to their Trojan prisoners, who, after considering both men's presentations, decided Odysseus was more deserving of the armour. Furious, Ajax cursed Odysseus, which earned him the ire of Athena, who temporarily made Ajax so mad with grief and anguish that he began killing sheep, thinking them his comrades. After a while, when Athena lifted his madness and Ajax realized that he had actually been killing sheep, he was so ashamed that he committed suicide. Odysseus eventually gave the armour to Neoptolemus, the son of Achilles. When Odysseus encounters the shade of Ajax much later in the House of Hades (Odyssey 11.543–566), Ajax is still so angry about the outcome of the competition that he refuses to speak to Odysseus.

The armour they fought for was made by Hephaestus thus making it much stronger and more beautiful than any armour a mortal could craft. He was made the gear because his first set was worn by Patroclus when he went to battle and taken by Hector when he killed Patroclus. The Shield of Achilles was also made by the fire god. His legendary spear was given to him by his mentor Chiron before he participated in the Trojan War. It was called the Pelian Spear which allegedly no other man could wield.

A relic claimed to be Achilles' bronze-headed spear was preserved for centuries in the temple of Athena on the acropolis of Phaselis, Lycia, a port on the Pamphylian Gulf. The city was visited in 333 BC by Alexander the Great, who envisioned himself as the new Achilles and carried the Iliad with him, but his court biographers do not mention the spear; however, it was shown in the time of Pausanias in the 2nd century CE.

Achilles, Ajax and a game of petteia 

Numerous paintings on pottery have suggested a tale not mentioned in the literary traditions. At some point in the war, Achilles and Ajax were playing a board game (petteia). They were absorbed in the game and oblivious to the surrounding battle. The Trojans attacked and reached the heroes, who were saved only by an intervention of Athena.

Worship and heroic cult 

The tomb of Achilles, extant throughout antiquity in Troad, was venerated by Thessalians, but also by Persian expeditionary forces, as well as by Alexander the Great and the Roman emperor Caracalla. Achilles' cult was also to be found at other places, e. g. on the island of Astypalaea in the Sporades, in Sparta which had a sanctuary, in Elis and in Achilles' homeland Thessaly, as well as in the Magna Graecia cities of Tarentum, Locri and Croton, accounting for an almost Panhellenic cult to the hero.

The cult of Achilles is illustrated in the 500 BC Polyxena sarcophagus, which depicts the sacrifice of Polyxena near the tumulus of Achilles. Strabo (13.1.32) also suggested that such a cult of Achilles existed in Troad:

The spread and intensity of the hero's veneration among the Greeks that had settled on the northern coast of the Pontus Euxinus, today's Black Sea, appears to have been remarkable. An archaic cult is attested for the Milesian colony of Olbia as well as for an island in the middle of the Black Sea, today identified with Snake Island (Ukrainian Зміїний, Zmiinyi, near Kiliya, Ukraine). Early dedicatory inscriptions from the Greek colonies on the Black Sea (graffiti and inscribed clay disks, these possibly being votive offerings, from Olbia, the area of Berezan Island and the Tauric Chersonese) attest the existence of a heroic cult of Achilles from the sixth century BC onwards. The cult was still thriving in the third century CE, when dedicatory stelae from Olbia refer to an Achilles Pontárchēs (Ποντάρχης, roughly "lord of the Sea," or "of the Pontus Euxinus"), who was invoked as a protector of the city of Olbia, venerated on par with Olympian gods such as the local Apollo Prostates, Hermes Agoraeus, or Poseidon.

Pliny the Elder (23–79 AD) in his Natural History mentions a "port of the Achæi" and an "island of Achilles", famous for the tomb of that "man", situated somewhat nearby Olbia and the Dnieper-Bug Estuary; furthermore, at 125 Roman miles from this island, he places a peninsula "which stretches forth in the shape of a sword" obliquely, called Dromos Achilleos (Ἀχιλλέως δρόμος, Achilléōs drómos "the Race-course of Achilles") and considered the place of the hero's exercise or of games instituted by him. This last feature of Pliny's account is considered to be the iconic spit, called today Tendra (or Kosa Tendra and Kosa Djarilgatch), situated between the mouth of the Dnieper and Karkinit Bay, but which is hardly 125 Roman miles ( km) away from the Dnieper-Bug estuary, as Pliny states. (To the "Race-course" he gives a length of 80 miles,  km, whereas the spit measures  km today.)

In the following chapter of his book, Pliny refers to the same island as Achillea and introduces two further names for it: Leuce or Macaron (from Greek [νῆσος] μακαρῶν "island of the blest"). The "present day" measures, he gives at this point, seem to account for an identification of Achillea or Leuce with today's Snake Island. Pliny's contemporary Pomponius Mela tells that Achilles was buried on an island named Achillea, situated between the Borysthenes and the Ister, adding to the geographical confusion. Ruins of a square temple, measuring 30 meters to a side, possibly that dedicated to Achilles, were discovered by Captain Kritzikly in 1823 on Snake Island. A second exploration in 1840 showed that the construction of a lighthouse had destroyed all traces of this temple. A fifth century BC black-glazed lekythos inscription, found on the island in 1840, reads: "Glaukos, son of Poseidon, dedicated me to Achilles, lord of Leuke." In another inscription from the fifth or fourth century BC, a statue is dedicated to Achilles, lord of Leuke, by a citizen of Olbia, while in a further dedication, the city of Olbia confirms its continuous maintenance of the island's cult, again suggesting its quality as a place of a supra-regional hero veneration.

The heroic cult dedicated to Achilles on Leuce seems to go back to an account from the lost epic Aethiopis according to which, after his untimely death, Thetis had snatched her son from the funeral pyre and removed him to a mythical  (Leúkē Nêsos "White Island"). Already in the fifth century BC, Pindar had mentioned a cult of Achilles on a "bright island" (φαεννά νᾶσος, phaenná nâsos) of the Black Sea, while in another of his works, Pindar would retell the story of the immortalized Achilles living on a geographically indefinite Island of the Blest together with other heroes such as his father Peleus and Cadmus. Well known is the connection of these mythological Fortunate Isles (μακαρῶν νῆσοι, makárôn nêsoi) or the Homeric Elysium with the stream Oceanus which according to Greek mythology surrounds the inhabited world, which should have accounted for the identification of the northern strands of the Euxine with it. Guy Hedreen has found further evidence for this connection of Achilles with the northern margin of the inhabited world in a poem by Alcaeus, speaking of "Achilles lord of Scythia" and the opposition of North and South, as evoked by Achilles' fight against the Aethiopian prince Memnon, who in his turn would be removed to his homeland by his mother Eos after his death.

The Periplus of the Euxine Sea gives the following details:

The Greek geographer Dionysius Periegetes, who likely lived during the first century CE, wrote that the island was called Leuce "because the wild animals which live there are white. It is said that there, in Leuce island, reside the souls of Achilles and other heroes, and that they wander through the uninhabited valleys of this island; this is how Jove rewarded the men who had distinguished themselves through their virtues, because through virtue they had acquired everlasting honour". Similarly, others relate the island's name to its white cliffs, snakes or birds dwelling there. Pausanias has been told that the island is "covered with forests and full of animals, some wild, some tame. In this island there is also Achilles' temple and his statue". Leuce had also a reputation as a place of healing. Pausanias reports that the Delphic Pythia sent a lord of Croton to be cured of a chest wound. Ammianus Marcellinus attributes the healing to waters (aquae) on the island.

Strabo mentioned that the cape of the Racecourse of Achilles was sacred to Achilles and although it was treeless, was called Alsos (ἄλσος). Alsos in Greek means "grove".

A number of important commercial port cities of the Greek waters were dedicated to Achilles. Herodotus, Pliny the Elder and Strabo reported on the existence of a town Achílleion (Ἀχίλλειον), built by settlers from Mytilene in the sixth century BC, close to the hero's presumed burial mound in the Troad. Later attestations point to an Achílleion in Messenia (according to Stephanus Byzantinus) and an Achílleios (Ἀχίλλειος) in Laconia. Nicolae Densuşianu recognized a connection to Achilles in the names of Aquileia and of the northern arm of the Danube delta, called Chilia (presumably from an older Achileii), though his conclusion, that Leuce had sovereign rights over the Black Sea, evokes modern rather than archaic sea-law.

The kings of Epirus claimed to be descended from Achilles through his son, Neoptolemus. Alexander the Great, son of the Epirote princess Olympias, could therefore also claim this descent, and in many ways strove to be like his great ancestor. He is said to have visited the tomb of Achilles at Achilleion while passing Troy. In AD 216 the Roman Emperor Caracalla, while on his way to war against Parthia, emulated Alexander by holding games around Achilles' tumulus.

Reception during antiquity

In Greek tragedy 

The Greek tragedian Aeschylus wrote a trilogy of plays about Achilles, given the title Achilleis by modern scholars. The tragedies relate the deeds of Achilles during the Trojan War, including his defeat of Hector and eventual death when an arrow shot by Paris and guided by Apollo punctures his heel. Extant fragments of the Achilleis and other Aeschylean fragments have been assembled to produce a workable modern play. The first part of the Achilleis trilogy, The Myrmidons, focused on the relationship between Achilles and chorus, who represent the Achaean army and try to convince Achilles to give up his quarrel with Agamemnon; only a few lines survive today. In Plato's Symposium, Phaedrus points out that Aeschylus portrayed Achilles as the lover and Patroclus as the beloved; Phaedrus argues that this is incorrect because Achilles, being the younger and more beautiful of the two, was the beloved, who loved his lover so much that he chose to die to avenge him.

The tragedian Sophocles also wrote The Lovers of Achilles, a play with Achilles as the main character. Only a few fragments survive.

Towards the end of the 5th century BC, a more negative view of Achilles emerges in Greek drama; Euripides refers to Achilles in a bitter or ironic tone in Hecuba, Electra, and Iphigenia in Aulis.

In Greek philosophy

Zeno
The philosopher Zeno of Elea centred one of his paradoxes on an imaginary footrace between "swift-footed" Achilles and a tortoise, by which he attempted to show that Achilles could not catch up to a tortoise with a head start, and therefore that motion and change were impossible. As a student of the monist Parmenides and a member of the Eleatic school, Zeno believed time and motion to be illusions.

Plato
In Hippias Minor, a dialogue attributed to Plato, an arrogant man named Hippias argues with Socrates. The two get into a discussion about lying. They decide that a person who is intentionally false must be "better" than a person who is unintentionally false, on the basis that someone who lies intentionally must understand the subject about which they are lying. Socrates uses various analogies, discussing athletics and the sciences to prove his point. The two also reference Homer extensively. Socrates and Hippias agree that Odysseus, who concocted a number of lies throughout the Odyssey and other stories in the Trojan War Cycle, was false intentionally. Achilles, like Odysseus, told numerous falsehoods. Hippias believes that Achilles was a generally honest man, while Socrates believes that Achilles lied for his own benefit. The two argue over whether it is better to lie on purpose or by accident. Socrates eventually abandons Homeric arguments and makes sports analogies to drive home the point: someone who does wrong on purpose is a better person than someone who does wrong unintentionally.

In Roman and medieval literature 
The Romans, who traditionally traced their lineage to Troy, took a highly negative view of Achilles. Virgil refers to Achilles as a savage and a merciless butcher of men, while Horace portrays Achilles ruthlessly slaying women and children. Other writers, such as Catullus, Propertius, and Ovid, represent a second strand of disparagement, with an emphasis on Achilles' erotic career. This strand continues in Latin accounts of the Trojan War by writers such as Dictys Cretensis and Dares Phrygius and in Benoît de Sainte-Maure's Roman de Troie and Guido delle Colonne's Historia destructionis Troiae, which remained the most widely read and retold versions of the Matter of Troy until the 17th century.

Achilles was described by the Byzantine chronicler Leo the Deacon, not as Hellene, but as Scythian, while according to the Byzantine author John Malalas, his army was made up of a tribe previously known as Myrmidons and later as Bulgars.

In modern literature and arts

Literature
 Achilles appears in Dante's Inferno (composed 1308–1320). He is seen in Hell's second circle, that of lust.
 Achilles is portrayed as a former hero who has become lazy and devoted to the love of Patroclus, in William Shakespeare's Troilus and Cressida (1602). Despicably, he has his Myrmidons murder the unarmed Hector, and then gets them to announce that Achilles himself has slain Hector, as if it had been in a fair fight (Act 5.9.5-14).
 The French dramatist Thomas Corneille wrote a tragedy La Mort d'Achille (1673).
 Achilles is the subject of the poem Achilleis (1799), a fragment by Johann Wolfgang von Goethe.
 In 1899, the Polish playwright, painter and poet Stanisław Wyspiański published a national drama, based on Polish history, named Achilles.
 In 1921, Edward Shanks published The Island of Youth and Other Poems, concerned among others with Achilles.
 The 1983 novel Kassandra by Christa Wolf also treats the death of Achilles.
 H.D.'s 1961 long poem Helen in Egypt features Achilles prominently as a figure who's irrational hatred of Helen traumatizes her, the bulk of the poem's plot being about her recovery.
 Akhilles is killed by a poisoned Kentaur arrow shot by Kassandra in Marion Zimmer Bradley's novel The Firebrand (1987).
 Achilles is one of various 'narrators' in Colleen McCullough's novel The Song of Troy (1998).
 The Death of Achilles (Смерть Ахиллеса, 1998) is an historical detective novel by Russian writer Boris Akunin that alludes to various figures and motifs from the Iliad.
 The character Achilles in Ender's Shadow (1999), by Orson Scott Card, shares his namesake's cunning mind and ruthless attitude.
 Achilles is one of the main characters in Dan Simmons's novels Ilium (2003) and Olympos (2005).
 Achilles is a major supporting character in David Gemmell's Troy series of books (2005–2007).
 Achilles is the main character in David Malouf's novel Ransom (2009).
 The ghost of Achilles appears in Rick Riordan's The Last Olympian (2009). He warns Percy Jackson about the Curse of Achilles and its side effects.
 Achilles is a main character in Terence Hawkins' 2009 novel The Rage of Achilles.
 Achilles is a major character in Madeline Miller's debut novel, The Song of Achilles (2011), which won the 2012 Orange Prize for Fiction. The novel explores the relationship between Patroclus and Achilles from boyhood to the fateful events of the Iliad.
 Achilles appears in the light novel series Fate/Apocrypha (2012–2014) as the Rider of Red.
 Achilles is a main character in Pat Barker's 2018 novel The Silence of the Girls, much of which is narrated by his slave Briseis.

Visual arts 
 Achilles with the Daughters of Lycomedes is a subject treated in paintings by Anthony van Dyck (before 1618; Museo del Prado, Madrid) and Nicolas Poussin (Museum of Fine Arts, Boston) among others.
 Peter Paul Rubens has authored a series of works on the life of Achilles, comprising the titles: Thetis dipping the infant Achilles into the river Styx, Achilles educated by the centaur Chiron, Achilles recognized among the daughters of Lycomedes, The wrath of Achilles, The death of Hector, Thetis receiving the arms of Achilles from Vulcanus, The death of Achilles (Museum Boijmans Van Beuningen, Rotterdam), and Briseis restored to Achilles (Detroit Institute of Arts; all –1635)
 Pieter van Lint, "Achilles Discovered among the Daughters of Lycomedes", 1645, at the Israel Museum, Jerusalem
 Dying Achilles is a sculpture created by Christophe Veyrier (Victoria and Albert Museum, London).
 The Rage of Achilles is a fresco by Giovanni Battista Tiepolo (1757, Villa Valmarana Ai Nani, Vicenza).
 Eugène Delacroix painted a version of The Education of Achilles for the ceiling of the Paris Palais Bourbon (1833–1847), one of the seats of the French Parliament.
  created a statue group Achilles and Penthesilea (1895; Vienna).
 Achilleus (1908) is a lithography by Max Slevogt.

Music 
Achilles has been frequently the subject of operas, ballets and related genres.
 Operas titled Deidamia were composed by Francesco Cavalli (1644) and George Frideric Handel (1739).
 Achille et Polyxène (Paris 1687) is an opera begun by Jean-Baptiste Lully and finished by Pascal Collasse.
 Achille et Déidamie (Paris 1735) is an opera composed by André Campra.
 Achilles (London 1733) is a ballad opera, written by John Gay, parodied by Thomas Arne as Achilles in petticoats in 1773.
 Achille in Sciro is a libretto by Metastasio, composed by Domenico Sarro for the inauguration of the Teatro di San Carlo (Naples, 4 November 1737). An even earlier composition is from Antonio Caldara (Vienna 1736). Later operas on the same libretto were composed by Leonardo Leo (Turin 1739), Niccolò Jommelli (Vienna 1749 and Rome 1772), Giuseppe Sarti (Copenhagen 1759 and Florence 1779), Johann Adolph Hasse (Naples 1759), Giovanni Paisiello (St. Petersburg 1772), Giuseppe Gazzaniga (Palermo 1781) and many others. It has also been set to music as Il Trionfo della gloria.
 Achille (Vienna 1801) is an opera by Ferdinando Paër on a libretto by Giovanni de Gamerra.
 Achille à Scyros (Paris 1804) is a ballet by Pierre Gardel, composed by Luigi Cherubini.
 Achilles, oder Das zerstörte Troja ("Achilles, or Troy Destroyed", Bonn 1885) is an oratorio by the German composer Max Bruch.
 Achilles auf Skyros (Stuttgart 1926) is a ballet by the Austrian-British composer and musicologist Egon Wellesz.
 Achilles' Wrath is a concert piece by Sean O'Loughlin.
 Achilles Last Stand is a track on the 1976 Led Zeppelin album Presence.
 Achilles, Agony and Ecstasy in Eight Parts is the first song on the 1992 Manowar album The Triumph of Steel.
 Achilles Come Down is a song on the 2017 Gang of Youths album Go Farther in Lightness.

Film and television
In films Achilles has been portrayed in the following films and television series:
 The 1924 film Helena by Carlo Aldini
 The 1954 film Ulysses by Piero Lulli
 The 1956 film Helen of Troy by Stanley Baker
 The 1961 film The Trojan Horse by Arturo Dominici
 The 1962 film The Fury of Achilles by Gordon Mitchell
 The 1997 television miniseries The Odyssey by Richard Trewett
 The 2003 television miniseries Helen of Troy by Joe Montana
 The 2004 film Troy by Brad Pitt
 The 2018 TV series Troy: Fall of a City by David Gyasi

Architecture

 In 1890, Elisabeth of Bavaria, Empress of Austria, had a summer palace built in Corfu. The building is named the Achilleion, after Achilles. Its paintings and statuary depict scenes from the Trojan War, with particular focus on Achilles.
 The Wellington Monument is a statue representing Achilles erected as a memorial to Arthur Wellesley, the first duke of Wellington, and his victories in the Peninsular War and the latter stages of the Napoleonic Wars.

Namesakes 
A 60-gun ship of that name served at the Battle of Belleisle in 1761 while a 74-gun ship served at the Battle of Trafalgar. Other battle honours include Walcheren 1809. An armored cruiser of that name served in the Royal Navy during the First World War.
In addition to earning the battle honour 'River Plate', HMNZS Achilles also served at Guadalcanal 1942–1943 and Okinawa in 1945. After returning to the Royal Navy, the ship was sold to the Indian Navy in 1948, but when she was scrapped parts of the ship were saved and preserved in New Zealand.
 A species of lizard, Anolis achilles, which has widened heel plates, is named for Achilles.

Gallery

References

Further reading 
 Ileana Chirassi Colombo (1977), "Heroes Achilleus – Theos Apollon." In Il Mito Greco, edd. Bruno Gentili and Giuseppe Paione. Rome: Edizione dell'Ateneo e Bizzarri.
 Anthony Edwards (1985a), "Achilles in the Underworld: Iliad, Odyssey, and Æthiopis". Greek, Roman, and Byzantine Studies. 26: pp. 215–227.
 Anthony Edwards (1985b), "Achilles in the Odyssey: Ideologies of Heroism in the Homeric Epic". Beiträge zur klassischen Philologie. 171.
 
 Graves, Robert, The Greek Myths, Harmondsworth, London, England, Penguin Books, 1960. 
Graves, Robert, The Greek Myths: The Complete and Definitive Edition. Penguin Books Limited. 2017. 

 

 
 Hélène Monsacré (1984), Les larmes d'Achille. Le héros, la femme et la souffrance dans la poésie d'Homère, Paris: Albin Michel.
 Gregory Nagy (1984), The Name of Achilles: Questions of Etymology and 'Folk Etymology, Illinois Classical Studies. 19.
 Gregory Nagy (1999), The Best of The Acheans: Concepts of the Hero in Archaic Greek Poetry. Johns Hopkins University Press (revised edition, online ).
 
 Dale S. Sinos (1991), The Entry of Achilles into Greek Epic, PhD thesis, Johns Hopkins University. Ann Arbor, Michigan: University Microfilms International.
 Jonathan S. Burgess (2009), The Death and Afterlife of Achilles. Baltimore: Johns Hopkins University Press.
 Abrantes, M.C. (2016), Themes of the Trojan Cycle: Contribution to the study of the greek mythological tradition (Coimbra).

External links 

 Trojan War Resources
 Gallery of the Ancient Art: Achilles
  Poem by Florence Earle Coates

Greek mythological heroes
Kings of the Myrmidons
Achaean Leaders
Thessalians in the Trojan War
Metamorphoses characters
Mythological rapists
Demigods in classical mythology
LGBT themes in Greek mythology
 
Deeds of Apollo
Medea
Fictional LGBT characters in literature